Stirling High School is a state high school for 11- to 18-year-olds run by Stirling Council in Stirling, Scotland. It is located on Torbrex Farm Road, near Torbrex Village in the suburbs of Stirling, previously being situated on the old volcanic rock where Stirling Castle lies and on Ogilvie Road.

The headteacher of the school is Paul Cassidy. The school operates a house system. The five houses are Douglas, Eccles, Randolph, Snowdon and Stewart.

Originally established for the training of ecclesiastics, it began as the seminary of the Church of the Holy Rude, founded in the reign of David I in 1129. Both the church and school, along with those of Perth, were brought under the charge of the monks of the Church of the Holy Trinity of Dunfermline in 1173.

New school buildings 
The school now operates from a new building on the former site of Williamfield Cricket Pitches, ex-home to Stirling County Cricket Club. Stirling High School had an official opening ceremony on 26 June 2008, which consisted of a ribbon cutting by former pupil Kirsty Young.

Private Finance Initiative 
The new school was financed by the Public Private Finance initiative, which involves the current site being sold to developers. Over the following years, the developers then lease the school back to the council. The school's facilities management is carried out by FES FM Ltd rather than Stirling Council. Teaching, administration and catering will continue to be provided by Stirling Council.

Location 
The new school sits adjacent to St Ninian's Primary School. It was built on a greenfield site of the old cricket club, and the current playing fields are to be sold off to housing.

Coat of arms and motto
The coat of arms shows Queen Margaret, richly habited and crowned bearing in her right hand a sceptre and in her left a book all proper between two trees of knowledge, to remind us of the remote 12th century, when a bishop of St. Andrews, in whose diocese Stirling was, gave to Queen Margaret's Church of the Holy Trinity of Dunfermline the churches of Perth and Stirling and their schools. The wolf, couchant gardant, at the Queen's feet is taken from the "Small" Burgh seal, and reflects the early interest in education taken by the magistrates of the Royal Burgh, for later charters speak of scholam de Striuelin, and Scholam ejusdam ville, which suggest that the 'Church' school fairly soon became the town's school.

The Latin motto Tempori Parendum translates to 'Be prepared for your time'.

The Old School

The High School of Stirling has been housed in several buildings over the course of its long history.

In 1856 the high school was housed in a specially created building on Spittal Street. This building housed the classrooms for Mathematics, English, Modern Languages, Art, Classics; as well as a Gymnasium, and an Observatory on the roof.

This school stayed open until 1962, long after the Education (Scotland) Act 1872 which made education compulsory for children aged 5 to 13 and dramatically increased the intake of pupils for the school, when the school moved from its place at the top of the town, to Torbrex - the previous position of the High School.

The building the old school was housed in is now the Stirling Highland Hotel.

The school's home from 1962 to 2008 was near the village of Torbrex.

Through the various relocations great care has been taken to ensure the history of the School has been retained. This has resulted in a dedicated 'Heritage Room' being included in both the 1960s and 2008 buildings. This room is managed by the Former Pupil Association and houses the school Remembrance Book, various whole school photographs and oak panelling from the Rector's office of the Spittal Street Building. Also moved was the War Memorial Window, stained glass windows from the 1850s building and the House Captain Board listing the recipients of the School Dux Award and the names of the Head Boys and Girls. All of these items are displayed in the main foyer of the school.

Notable former pupils

 Kieron Achara - Basketball player
 Henry Campbell-Bannerman - Prime Minister
 William A.F. Browne (1805–1885) - first president of the Medico-Psychological Association
 Sir David Bruce KCB (1855–1931) - bacteriologist
 Patrick Forbes - 17th-century Bishop of Aberdeen
 Linda Gilroy - Labour and Co-operative Member of Parliament 
 John Grierson (1898–1972) - filmmaker
 Robert Henry - historian
 Allister Hogg - Scottish international rugby player
 James MacLaren - architect
 Norman McLaren (1914–1987) - animator and film director
 Muir Mathieson (1911–1975) - conductor 
 Sir John Murray - oceanographer
 Craig Oliver - former BBC media executive and Downing Street Director of Communications
 Steven Paterson - SNP MP for Stirling
 Sir Craig Reedie - chairman of the British Olympic Association
 Helen Renton - Director of the Women's Royal Air Force
 Sir Josiah Symon KCMG - Attorney-General of Australia
 Gregor Tait - Scottish international swimmer and reigning Commonwealth Games 200-m backstroke and 200-m individual medley champion
 Prof John Mitchell Watt - pharmacologist
 Kirsty Young - television journalist

References

Bibliography 
History of the High School of Stirling by A. F. Hutchison, Rector of the school 1866 - 1896.  The Sentinel Press (Eneas Mackay), Stirling, 1904.

External links

Stirling High School's page on Scottish Schools Online
 

Secondary schools in Stirling (council area)
Educational institutions established in the 12th century
1129 establishments in Scotland
Buildings and structures in Stirling (city)
School buildings completed in 1962
School buildings completed in 2008
School buildings completed in 1856